Sumo is an upcoming Tamil-language sports comedy drama film produced by Vels Film International. The film is directed by S. P. Hosimin. The film features Shiva, Priya Anand, Yogi Babu, and Yoshinori Tashiro, a Japanese sumo wrestler as the titular character of the film. Shiva is also credited for the screenplay and dialogues for the film. The cinematography is by Rajiv Menon and the music score was composed by Nivas K Prasanna. The film was planned to release in January 2020 on the occasion of Pongal, but filmmakers pulled the film from the release schedule.

Premise 
A sumo wrestler enters the life of a surfing instructor and his love interest. The rest of the film centers around his backstory and the twists he brings to their life.

Cast 

 Shiva as Shiva
 Priya Anand as Piyaa
 Yoshinori Tashiro
 VTV Ganesh
Yogi Babu
 Srinath
 Chetan as Pandian, a police officer
 Besant Ravi

Production 
A major portion of the film was filmed in Japan, where the story is set. Cinematographer Rajiv Menon was impressed by the story and the chance to collaborate with Sumo wrestlers returned to film the movie after a seven-year hiatus. Yoshinori Tashiro was selected by Shiva to play the titular character in the film . Eighteen sumo wrestlers were also featured in the film.

A song for the film, intended to be a theme for the Ganesh Chathurthi, featuring Shiva, was shot at the AVM Studios in Chennai. Menon expressed that the film's visual tone will be similar to that of The Karate Kid.

Music 
The music is composed by Nivas K Prasanna, with Sony Music obtaining the audio rights. With lyrics written by Rokesh, Pa. Vijay and Kabilan Vairamuthu. Diwakar, Sid Sriram, and Nakul Abhyankar are confirmed singers for the movie.

Release 
In November 2019, the production house announced that the film will be releasing in theatres on Pongal 2020. However, the release was postponed due to the COVID-19 pandemic shuttering cinemas. The film is expected to have a direct OTT release in 2022.

References 

Upcoming films
Upcoming Tamil-language films
Indian sports comedy-drama films
Sumo films
Indian comedy films